Emilio Polli (10 April 1901 – 30 January 1983) was an Italian swimmer. He was in the Olympic swimming team at the 1924 and 1928 Summer Olympics, and in the national team at the first two European Championships, at Budapest in 1926 and at Bologna in 1927. He competed in 100 m freestyle and 4 × 200 m freestyle events.

References

1906 births
1983 deaths
Olympic swimmers of Italy
Swimmers at the 1924 Summer Olympics
Swimmers at the 1928 Summer Olympics
Swimmers from Milan
Italian male freestyle swimmers
20th-century Italian people